King Pin is a nunatak,  high, rising above the Wilson Piedmont Glacier, Antarctica, about midway between Mount Doorly and Hogback Hill. It was named by the Victoria University of Wellington Antarctic Expedition, 1958–59, after the American helicopter King Pin which flew the party into this area, and which rendered a similar service in two other years to New Zealand parties.

References

Nunataks of Victoria Land
Scott Coast